= Re Welch =

New Zealand Privy Council case regarding estate law

Re welch
- Court: Privy Council
- Full case name: Albyn Henry Stewart Appellant v. James Borthwick Welch Respondent
- Decided: 2 July 1990
- Citation: [1990] NZPC 4; [1990] UKPC 30; [1990] 3 NZLR 1; (1990) 7 FRNZ 536
- Transcript: http://www.nzlii.org/cgi-bin/sinodisp/nz/cases/NZPC/1990/4.html

Court membership
- Judges sitting: LORD KEITH OF KINKEL, LORD GRIFFITHS, LORD OLIVER OF AYLMERTON, LORD LOWRY, SIR ROBIN COOKE

Re Welch (1990] NZPC 4; [1990] UKPC 30; [1990] 3 NZLR 1; (1990) 7 FRNZ 536 is a cited case in New Zealand law regarding claims under the Law Reform (Testamentary Promises) Act 1949.
